Abner Read (1821–1863) was an officer of the United States Navy who distinguished himself in the American Civil War. At the time of his death, he had attained the rank of lieutenant commander.

Early life and education
Abner Read was born April 5, 1821, in Urbana, Ohio, to Ezra Read and Nancy (Clark) Read. He studied at Ohio University, but left that institution a year before graduating to accept a warrant as a midshipman, effective March 2, 1839.

Following a year of study at the naval school in Philadelphia, Pennsylvania, Read was promoted to passed midshipman on July 2, 1845.  then took him to the Atlantic coast of Africa where she operated against slavers through the summer of 1847.

Sea and shore duty, 1848–1860
His vessel promptly began issuing supplies to the warships of Commodore Matthew C. Perry's squadron and continued such duty until heading home in June.

Fredonia again left New York on December 11, 1848, bound for California. Gold recently had been discovered there, greatly increasing the importance of and the interest in that newly acquired territory. The ship proceeded south along the Atlantic coast of the Americas, rounded Cape Horn, reached San Francisco Bay on July 31, 1849, and operated on the west coast during the most tempestuous year of the gold rush. She got underway homeward on July 4, 1850, and reached New York on January 7, 1851.

She took him to the Mediterranean, but he left that ship while she was still in European waters and returned to the United States for duty at the Portsmouth Navy Yard.

Meanwhile, Read had been rising in rank. He received his commission as master effective April 12, 1853 and was promoted to lieutenant on February 6, 1854.

Read joined the wardroom of the sloop-of-war  in the fall of 1854, departed Norfolk, Virginia, in her on December 16, 1854, and cruised through the West Indies unsuccessfully seeking information concerning . That sloop-of-war had departed Aspinwall, Colombia, (now Colón, Panama), on September 29, 1854 and had not been heard from since sailing.

Soon after Falmouth returned to New York in August, Read was shocked to be "dropped from the Navy" on September 13, 1855 in compliance with the recommendation of a board of officers charged with carrying "...into execution an act [of Congress] to promote the efficiency of the Navy." He appealed this decision and was reinstated in rank by a board of inquiry in 1858.

That sailor had been killed by fire from Paraguayan batteries upon his side-wheel steamer as she explored the Paraná River and its tributaries.

Following the resolution of the dispute between the United States and Paraguay through diplomacy backed by a highly visible display of American seapower, Supply operated off the coast of Africa, along the Atlantic coast of the United States, and in the Gulf of Mexico.

Civil War service
Supply arrived at Pensacola, Florida, on December 7, 1860, just a month and a day after Abraham Lincoln was elected President of the United States, precipitating the secession crisis. Just over a week later,  entered the navy yard at that port to have her hull scraped. That screw steamer was short of officers due to the resignation of Southerners, so Read was detached from Supply and assigned to the new arrival. In her he helped to prevent Fort Pickens from falling into Confederate hands. However, while doing so, he became ill and was sent home to recuperate.

Command of the USS New London
Ready for duty again, Read took command of the newly acquired  when she was commissioned at New York on October 29, 1861. Assigned to the Gulf Squadron, his screw steamer was stationed in Mississippi Sound where she joined screw gunboat  in taking the lumber-laden schooner Olive shortly before midnight on November 21, 1861.

In ensuing months, New London took over 30 prizes. Her success was so remarkable that Flag Officer David Farragut felt that he must hold New London in his new command even though she had been assigned to the eastern group when the Navy divided its force in the gulf into two squadrons. "...Lieutenant Read's having made her such a terror to the Confederates in this quarter", he explained, "...that justice to the service required me to keep her...." She was, he maintained, "...absolutely necessary to command the inland passage...."

Read and his ship were ever ready to face up to any challenge which confronted them.

Read was promoted to lieutenant commander on July 16, 1862, and on April 18, 1863, he led a boat expedition which landed near the lighthouse at Sabine Pass. It was attacked by a large force of Confederate troops who had been hiding behind the light keeper's house. All but one member of Read's crew were wounded as they raced back to their boat and rowed to New London. Read himself suffered a serious gunshot wound of the eye. Yet, despite his painful injury, he remained on duty until New London returned to New Orleans, Louisiana, late in May for repairs.

Six days later his new ship headed up the Mississippi River to defend Donaldsonville, Louisiana, which was then being threatened by Southern troops. As its beleaguered riparian fortresses at Vicksburg, Mississippi, and Port Hudson were about to slip from its grasp, the Confederacy was struggling desperately to maintain some hold on the river.

Monongahela spent the ensuing days patrolling the Mississippi between Donaldsonville and New Orleans. On the morning of July 7, 1863, Southern forces opened fire on the ship with artillery and musketry when she was about ten miles below Donaldsonville. A shell smashed through the bulwarks on her port quarter wounding Read in his abdomen and his right knee. He was taken to a hospital at Baton Rouge, Louisiana, where he died on the evening of the next day.

Farragut and the other officers of the squadron were lavish in praise of their fallen comrade. The admiral said that Read had "...perhaps done as much fighting as any man in this war.... The very mention of his name", Farragut maintained, "was a source of terror to the rebels." On another occasion, the Admiral said, "I know nothing of him prejudicial as a man, but I do know that no Navy can boast a better officer and I deem him a great loss both to the Navy and to his country."

Legacies

See also

Notes

References
 Charles Elmer Rice A history of the Hanna family: Being a genealogy of the descendants of Thomas Hanna and Elizabeth (Henderson) Hanna, who emigrated to America in 1763, Damascus, Ohio: A. Pim & Son, printers, 1905
 

1821 births
1863 deaths
United States Navy officers
Union Navy officers
People from Urbana, Ohio
People of Ohio in the American Civil War
Union military personnel killed in the American Civil War